Planetary is an American comic book series created by writer Warren Ellis and artist John Cassaday, and published by the Wildstorm imprint of DC Comics. After an initial preview issue in September 1998, the series ran for 27 issues from April 1999 to October 2009.

Publication history
Planetary was previewed in issue #33 of Gen¹³ and issue #6 of C-23, both dated September 1998. The first issue of the series was cover-dated April 1999. Originally intended to be a 24-issue bi-monthly series, the series was on hold from 2001 to 2003 due to illness of writer Warren Ellis and other commitments by Cassaday. Laura Martin (also credited as Laura DePuy) colored almost every issue of the series. The series recommenced in 2004 and concluded with issue #27 in October 2009.

Ellis intended the focus of the book to be the superhero genre, rather than the superheroes themselves: "I wanted to do something that actually went deeper into the subgenre, exposed its roots and showed its branches" and stated in his proposal for the comic series: "[...] What if you had a hundred years of superhero history just slowly leaking out into this young and modern superhero world of the Wildstorm Universe? What if you could take everything old and make it new again?"

Rich Kreiner described John Cassaday's artwork in The Comics Journal as being "close to the gold standard for fabulous realism in mainstream comics". Tom Underhill noted colorist Laura Martin's contribution as "every bit as compelling" as Cassaday's in his review for The Comics Journal.

One of the main features of the series is the portrayal of alternate versions of many figures from popular culture, such as Godzilla, Tarzan, Sherlock Holmes, and Doc Savage. This extends to comic book characters from both DC Comics (e.g. Superman, Green Lantern, and Wonder Woman) and Marvel Comics (e.g. the Fantastic Four, the Hulk, and Thor).

Ellis also introduced the concept of a multiverse to the series, drawing upon the mathematical concept known as the Monster group for inspiration. The multiverse is described as "a theoretical snowflake existing in 196,833 dimensional space", a reference to the visualization method used by some mathematicians when describing the Monster group.

Fictional group biography
Describing themselves as "Archaeologists of the Impossible", Planetary is an organization intent on discovering the world's secret history. Funded by the mysterious Fourth Man, the field team consists of three superhuman beings: Jakita Wagner (strong, fast and almost invulnerable); The Drummer (can detect and manipulate information streams, such as computer data links and radio waves); and new recruit Elijah Snow (can create intense cold and extract heat). Planetary member Ambrose Chase (can create a "selective physics-distortion field") was also a member of the field team until he was killed. It was later revealed that Ambrose Chase was still alive and had used his powers to manipulate time and suspend himself in a time distortion bubble where the effects of his mortal injuries proceeded at an incredibly slow pace. Elijah Snow and the rest of Planetary, using technology based on Randall Dowling's notes, were able to recover Ambrose Chase and save his life.

The field team travel the world investigating strange phenomena - including monsters, aliens and other superhumans, unusual relics and suppressed military secrets - for both the betterment of mankind and out of sheer curiosity. The group is, first covertly and later more and more openly, opposed by a rival group of metahumans called the Four, based on Marvel's Fantastic Four (Dr. Randall Dowling, Kim Süskind, William Leather and Jacob Greene) who are using the secrets of the world for personal gain.

Characters

Collected editions

The series, and spin-offs, have been collected into a number of volumes:

 Planetary:
 Volume 1: All Over the World and Other Stories (collects Preview & #1-6; hardcover and softcover )
 Volume 2: The Fourth Man (collects #7-12; hardcover and softcover )
 Volume 3: Leaving the 20th Century (collects #13-18; hardcover  and softcover )
 Volume 4: Spacetime Archaeology  (collects #19-27; hardcover  and softcover )
 Planetary: Crossing Worlds (collects the three crossover one-shots above; softcover only )
 Planetary Book One (collects #1-14, Planetary Sneak Peek, and Planetary/The Authority: Ruling the World; also script to #1, character design sketches) ) (July 2017) (softcover)
 Planetary Book Two (collects #15-27, Planetary/JLA: Terra Occulta, and Planetary/Batman: Night on Earth) ) (March 2018) (softcover)
 Absolute Planetary volume 1 (collects Preview & #1-12, also script to #1; slipcased hardcover  )
 Absolute Planetary volume 2 (collects #13-27; slipcased hardcover )
 The Planetary Omnibus (collects Preview, #1-27, plus the three crossover one-shots above, also script to #1, character design sketches, and cover art for both Absolute Editions and the four trade paperbacks); hardcover only )

Awards
 2000:
 Nominated for "Best Continuing Series" Eisner Award
 Nominated for "Best New Series" Eisner Award
 2002: Nominated for "Best Continuing Series" Eisner Award
 2005: Nominated for "Best Serialized Story" Eisner Award, for Planetary #19-20 ("Mystery in Space/Rendezvous")

References

External links

Planetary Comic Appreciation Page
Planetary Timeline
World of Black Heroes: Jakita Wagner Biography

Comics by Warren Ellis
DC Comics organizations
Metafictional comics
Widescreen comics
WildStorm superhero teams